Shanmugam Kasiviswanathan  (born 26 March 1959), better known as K. Shanmugam, is a Singaporean politician and lawyer who has been serving as Minister for Law since 2008 and Minister for Home Affairs since 2015. A member of the governing People's Action Party (PAP), he has been the Member of Parliament (MP) representing the Chong Pang division of Nee Soon GRC since 2011. 

A lawyer by profession, Shanmugam made a name for himself in litigation, arbitration and insolvency cases before he entered politics. In 1998, at the age of 38, he was one of the youngest lawyers in Singapore to be appointed Senior Counsel. Along with Davinder Singh, he was known as one of the "twin titans of litigation" and a prominent figure in Singapore's legal circles. Shanmugam has also received praise for being one of the top cross-examiners in Singapore and has acted for and against all three prime ministers in civil lawsuits.

Kurt Campbell, former United States Assistant Secretary of State for East Asian and Pacific Affairs, once spoke of Shanmugam: "The quality of his mind is impressive. In meetings with him, he has legal framing, approaches problems in a deeply systemic way, is unsentimental about the world, clear-eyed and very strategic... He can be hard-headed about what is best for Singapore, but he is always upfront and clear."

Education
Shanmugam was educated at Raffles Institution from 1972 to 1977. He went on to read law at the National University of Singapore's Faculty of Law and graduated in 1984.

During his time in law school, Shanmugam earned several awards, book prizes and scholarships for being the top student from his first to third years and for academic merit (1982–1983). He also won the Montrose Memorial Prize for Jurisprudence (1984).

Shanmugam was awarded the Adrian Clarke Memorial Medal, the Leow Chia Heng Prize and the External Examiner's Prize (1984) for being the top law student of his graduating class and top student in the final-year examinations. He also represented Singapore in the Philip C. Jessup International Law Moot Court Competition in 1984, in which his team won Runner-Up in the International Division.

Legal career 
After being admitted to the Singapore Bar as an advocate and solicitor in 1985, Shanmugam went into private practice and became a senior partner and Head of Litigation and Dispute Resolution at Allen & Gledhill.

In 1998, Shanmugam became one of the youngest lawyers to be appointed Senior Counsel of the Supreme Court at the age of 38.

Shanmugam has acted for Singapore's Prime Minister Lee Hsien Loong and his predecessors (Lee Kuan Yew and Goh Chok Tong) in lawsuits. In 1995, the International Herald Tribune selected Shanmugam to represent them after the Lees and Goh initiated a civil libel lawsuit against the newspaper. Lee Kuan Yew later stated that the Tribune's decision to choose Shanmugam to represent them even though he was a People's Action Party member and was close to the Lees and Goh, was the highest form of praise to the Senior Counsel's integrity and to the integrity of the Singapore Government as a whole.

Political career 
Shanmugam entered politics when he joined the People's Action Party (PAP) team contesting Sembawang GRC in the 1988 general election. The PAP team won and Shanmugam became a Member of Parliament representing the Chong Pang ward of Sembawang GRC.

Shanmugam served as a Member of Parliament and continued to practise law until 2008 when he joined the Cabinet to replace S. Jayakumar as Minister for Law. He was concurrently appointed Second Minister for Home Affairs in 2008, and succeeded Wong Kan Seng as Minister for Home Affairs in 2010.

Following the 2011 general election, Shanmugam relinquished his portfolio as Minister for Home Affairs and was appointed Minister for Foreign Affairs, while continuing to serve concurrently as Minister for Law. As of 2015, Shanmugam remains as a Member of Parliament representing Chong Pang ward, which had become part of Nee Soon GRC.

Following Shanmugam's remarks on changes to the qualifying criteria for Singapore's elected presidency, he was criticised by former presidential candidate Tan Cheng Bock for pre-empting the legislative process and the Presidential Elections Committee, which decides the eligibility of candidates for the presidential election.

In February 2018, Shanmugam said that Singapore would change its criminal breach of trust (CBT) laws to address concerns that company directors and key officers of charities would face lower maximum penalties for CBT offences compared to their employees.

Shanmugam was a member of the Select Committee on Deliberate Online Falsehoods formed in 2018. During the public hearings, he questioned Simon Milner, Facebook's Vice President of Public Policy for Asia-Pacific, about the misuse of online data by Cambridge Analytica., and crossed swords with historian Thum Ping Tjin over a paper about Operation Coldstore written by Thum in 2013.

As Minister for Law 
As Minister for Law, Shanmugam was a believer in tempering the law with empathy. This has been the basis to make Singapore's laws to be more compassionate, with greater collectivism, and to make the country to looks out for those who are unable to look after themselves.

During Shanmugam's tenure as Minister for Law, some changes to the criminal and family justice system were effected. These include: 
 Overhaul of the existing Penal Code, to modernise Singapore's criminal laws and enhance protection for the vulnerable in society, such as women and children. 
 Enactment of the Protection from Harassment Act, to provide remedies and recourse for victims of harassment, online bullying and stalking. Subsequent amendments fortified the Act by establishing a stand-alone Protection from Harassment Court to allow protection to be obtained expediently by victims, including that of intimate partner violence.
 Enhancing access to justice through government funding for legal representation of accused persons. 
 Major changes to the family justice system, in which the child's welfare and best interests are placed at the centre of the system. Changes also include helping families navigate the court system with less costs and delays by handling family disputes in less rancorous ways.
 Introduction of community-based sentences to tap on community resources in the rehabilitation of offenders.
 Review of the mandatory death penalty to give judges discretion to replace the death penalty with life imprisonment in cases involving unintentional homicide and drug trafficking by couriers, if the stipulated conditions for such are met.
 Amendments to the Misuse of Drugs Act to fortify Singapore's drug rehabilitation regime through a more calibrated approach.

Other appointments 
Shanmugam served on the board of directors for several companies before his appointment to the Singapore Cabinet.

Directorships 
 Non-Executive Director of Sembcorp (July 1998 – April 2008)
 Director of Asia Food & Properties (July 1997 – 2001)
 Director of Golden Agri-Resources (May 1999 – 2001)

Board 
 Advisory Board of the Faculty of Law
 Raffles Institution Board of Governors
 Media Development Authority
 Sembawang Corporation Industries Ltd

Shanmugam served as the President of the Singapore Indian Development Association (SINDA) from March 2002 to March 2009.

Personal life 
Shanmugam has been married to clinical psychologist Seetha Shanmugam since 2008. He was formerly married to Jothie Rajah, daughter of KS Rajah. They later divorced. 

Shanmugam is a practising Hindu. He is also often involved in various religious activities organised by communities of various faiths. He has met Pope Francis in the Vatican City and has referred to the Pontiff as exemplifying the "essence of religion" and a "strong advocate of interfaith dialogue and understanding".

Shanmugam also participates regularly in the Taoist Nine Emperor God's festival in his Constituency since he became an MP for the area.

References

External links

 K. Shanmugam on Prime Minister's Office
 K. Shanmugam on Parliament of Singapore
 

Members of the Cabinet of Singapore
Members of the Parliament of Singapore
People's Action Party politicians
20th-century Singaporean lawyers
National University of Singapore alumni
Raffles Institution alumni
Singaporean people of Tamil descent
Singaporean Hindus
1959 births
Living people
Ministers for Foreign Affairs of Singapore
Singaporean Senior Counsel
Ministers for Law of Singapore
Ministers for Home Affairs of Singapore